Mesomedes of Crete was a Greek citharode and lyric poet and composer of the early 2nd century AD in Roman Greece. Prior to the discovery of the Seikilos epitaph in the late 19th century, the hymns of Mesomedes were the only surviving written music from the ancient world.  Three were published by Vincenzo Galilei in his Dialogo della musica antica e della moderna (Florence, 1581), during a period of intense investigation into music of the ancient Greeks. These hymns had been preserved through the Byzantine tradition, and were presented to Vincenzo by Girolamo Mei.

Life and career
He was a freedman of the Emperor Hadrian, on whose favorite Antinous he is said to have written a panegyric, specifically called a Citharoedic Hymn (Suda). Two epigrams by him in the Greek Anthology (Anthol. pal. xiv. 63, xvi. 323) are extant, and a hymn to Nemesis. The hymn is one of four which preserve the ancient musical notation written over the text. Two hymns formerly assigned to Dionysius of Alexandria, one to the muse Calliope and one entitled Hymn to the Sun, have also been attributed to Mesomedes. In an article published in 2003, Annie Bélis proves that the Berlin musical papyrus (inv. 6870) contains a Paean to Apollo written by Mesomedes. A total of 15 poems by Mesomedes are known.

Mesomedes continued in the Musaeum in Alexandria even after Hadrian's death (138); there the Historia Augusta reports that during Antoninus Pius' reign (138–161) his state salary was reduced.  The emperor Caracalla (212–217) honored Mesomedes with a cenotaph approximately 50 to 60 years after his death.

See J. F. Bellermann, Die Hymnen des Dionysius und Mesomedes (1840); C. de Jan, Musici scriptores graeci (1899); S. Reinach in Revue des études grecques, ix (1896); Suda s.v.

Hymns

Prayer to the Muse 
The dialect of this hymn is different from the others (Ionian rather than Doric), and the style is also slightly different; for this reason J.G. Landels believes that it is probably not by Mesomedes.

Prayer to Calliope and Apollo

Hymn to the Sun

Literature
 Vincenzo Galilei, Dialogo Di Vincentio Galilei Nobile Fiorentino Della Musica Antica, Et Della Moderna (Fiorenza, 1581) (google), p. 97
 Johann Friedrich Bellermann, Die Hymnen des Dionysius und Mesomedes. Text und Melodieen nach Handschriften und den alten Ausgaben bearbeitet von Dr. Friedrich Bellermann (Berlin, 1840) (google)
 Rheinisches Museum für Philologie. Neue Folge. Neunter Jahrgang (Frankfurt, 1854) (google); p. 306–311: Theodor Bergk, Zu den Hymnen des Dionysius und Mesomedes
 Karl von Jan (Latin: Carolus Janus), Musici scriptores graeci. Aristoteles   Euclides   Nicomachus   Bacchius   Gaudentius   Alypius   et melodiarum veterum quidquid exstat. Recognovit prooemiis et indice instruxit Carolus Janus. Annexae sunt tabulae (Lipsia, 1895) (google-US), p. 454ff.
 Musici scriptores graeci. Recognovit prooemiis et indice instruxit Carolus Janus. Supplementum, melodiarum reliquiae (Lipsia, 1899) (google-US)
 Revue des études grecques. Tome IX. Année 1896 (Paris, 1896) (google-US); p. 1–22: Théodore Reinach, L'hymne a la Muse
Landels, John G. (1999). Music in Ancient Greece and Rome. Routledge. . 
Pöhlmann, Egert; West, Martin L. (2001). Documents of Ancient Greek Music: The Extant Melodies and Fragments, edited and transcribed with commentary by Egert Pöhlmann and Martin L. West. Oxford: Clarendon Press. .
In anthologies:
 Richard François Philippe Brunck, Analecta veterum poetarum graecorum. Editore Rich. Fr. Phil. Brunck. Tom. II. (Argentoratum; ed. IV.: Argentoratum, 1785) (google; ed. IV.: google), p. 292f.
 Richard François Philippe Brunck and Christian Friedrich Wilhelm Jacobs, Anthologia graeca sive poetarum graecorum lusus. Ex recensione Brunckii. Tom. III. Indices et commentarium adiecit Friedericus Iacobs (Lipsia, 1794) (google), p. 6f.

 Jean François Boissonade de Fontarabie, Ποιητῶν ἑλληνικῶν συλλογή. τόμ. ιεʹ. – Poetarum graecorum sylloge. Tom. XV. — Ἀλκαῖος Σαπφώ Σιμωνίδης σύνεσιος λυρικοὶ διάφοροι. – Lyrici graeci curante Jo. Fr. Boissonade (Paris, 1825) (google), p. 49ff.
  (Lipsia, 1827) (google), p. 70f.
 Anthologia graeca sive delectus poesis elegiacae melicae bucolicae. Scholarum in usum adornavit Nicolaus Bachius (Hannovera, 1838) (google), p. 128
 James Donaldson, Lyra Græca: Specimens of the Greek Lyric Poets, from Callinus to Soutsos. Edited, with critical Notes, and a biographical Introduction, by James Donaldson (Edinburgh & London, 1854) (google), p. 96f.
 Theodor Bergk,  (Lipsia, 1854) (google), p. 403f.
  (Lipsia, 1868) (google), p. 522ff.

Notes

References
 
 Egert Pöhlmann: "Mesomedes", Grove Music Online ed. L. Macy (Accessed 30 November 2005); (subscription access)

External links
 "Hymn to the Muses" (PDF) and "Hymn to Nemesis" (PDF) in Greek with brief glosses/commentary
 'Hymn to Nemesis' in English translation with Greek original

 Homepage of the Ensemble Musica Romana for ancient music (English and German)
 Ensemble Kérylos a music group directed by scholar Annie Bélis and dedicated to the recreation of ancient Greek and Roman music. Its recording D'Euripide aux premiers chrétiens contains the 5 known works by Mesomedes (tracks 9 to 13).
 Prayer to Calliope and Apollo. Sung to the lyre by Stefan Hagel.
 Hymn to the Sun. Petros Tabouris Ensemble.
 Hymn to Nemesis. Ensemble de Organographia.
 Hymn to Nemesis/ Petros Tabouris Ensemble.

Ancient Cretan poets
Ancient Greek lyric poets
Ancient Greek composers
2nd-century poets
2nd-century Greek people
2nd-century Romans
Ancient Greek slaves and freedmen
Emperor's slaves and freedmen
Roman Crete
Roman Alexandria
Ancient Greeks in Rome
Epigrammatists of the Greek Anthology
Doric Greek poets
Year of birth unknown
Year of death unknown